Everything! is a compilation album by post-punk band Tones on Tail, released in 1998 as a double CD.

The first disc features the original Pop album, while the second disc collects the Burning Skies and Tones on Tail EPs, along with the "There's Only One!", "Performance", "Lions" and "Christian Says" singles. The order of songs "When You're Smiling" and "You, the Night and the Music" was reversed on this compilation. Included as a bonus was a live performance of Elvis Presley's "Heartbreak Hotel" (the only officially released Tones on Tail live recording), followed by a radio interview with Daniel Ash.

A handful of alternate mixes were not released as part of this collection: the radio edits of "Go!" and "Burning Skies", as well as an extended mix of "Twist", were released on the promo EP Something!.

"Copper" was originally designated as playable at either 45 or  RPM, as it was originally released on vinyl; the 45 RPM version of the song is included in this set.

Reception
Writing for AllMusic, critic Ned Raggett said that the need for a complete compilation of Tones on Tail work "was long overdue". Describing the group's underground hit "Go!", he said: "It remains a wonderful, atypical dancefloor smash, with Ash's loopy 'ya-ya' chorus, Haskins' nutty percussion patterns, Campling's great fuzz bassline, and more all coming together in weird and fun ways".

Track listing

Disc One

Disc Two

Notes
 Tracks 1-9 from the Pop studio album (1984)
 Track 10 from the "Lions" single (1984)
 Tracks 11-12 from the "Christian Says" single (1984)
 Tracks 13-16 from the Burning Skies EP (1983)
 Tracks 17-18 from the "There's Only One!" single (1982)
 Tracks 19-22 from the Tones on Tail EP (1982)
 Tracks 23-24 from the "Performance" single (1984)
 Track 25 from the Night Music compilation (1987)

References

External links

1998 compilation albums
Beggars Banquet Records compilation albums
Tones on Tail albums